Trespass is the debut and the first extended play by the South Korean boy group Monsta X. It was released by Starship Entertainment and distributed by LOEN Entertainment on May 14, 2015. It has seven tracks, including the title track of the same name.

Background and release
Trespass is Monsta X's debut release. The EP includes the pre-debut release "Interstellar" by members Hyungwon, Jooheon, and I.M, that was originally released as part of the Mnet's survival reality show No.Mercy.

The group held a showcase at the Lotte Card Art Center in Hapjeong-dong, Mapo-gu, Seoul on May 13.

The music video for the title track was released on 1theK's official YouTube channel on the same day and was directed by the South Korean music video director and CEO of Iceland Joo Hee-sun.

Composition
The debut EP contains seven tracks, with the theme of the challenging lifestyles of the seven members and the strength of absorbing the colors of the producers, while projecting the confidence of Monsta X everywhere.

"Trespass" is a hip-hop track that combines raw sound and intense performance. It also means that the members are young and trying to break into new things, while representing each member's individuality.

Commercial performance
As of 2020, the debut EP had already accumulated a total of 41,593 copies sold on the Gaon Music Chart in South Korea.

"Trespass" debuted and peaked at number 148 on the weekly Gaon Digital Chart, as well as number 14 on the weekly Billboard World Digital Song Sales chart.

Track listing

Charts

Album

Weekly chart

Monthly chart

Year-end chart

Songs

Weekly charts

Sales

Release history

See also
 List of K-pop songs on the Billboard charts
 List of K-pop songs on the World Digital Song Sales chart

References 

2015 debut EPs
Korean-language EPs
Kakao M EPs
Monsta X EPs
 Starship Entertainment EPs